Celestin is a surname. Notable people with the surname include:

Amir Celestin (born 1990), American basketball player
Josaphat Celestin (born 1956), Haitian-American politician
Jude Célestin (born 1962), Haitian politician
Martial Célestin (1913-2011), first Prime Minister of Haiti 
Oliver Celestin (born 1981), American football safety
Papa Celestin (1884–1954), American bandleader